Joseph Charles Pawelek (born December 8, 1986) is a former American football linebacker who played for the Seattle Seahawks of the National Football League. He was considered one of the top linebacker prospects available for the 2010 NFL Draft. He graduated from Smithson Valley High school, coached under Larry Hill. He played college football for Baylor.

Professional career

Seattle Seahawks
He signed as free agent with the Seattle Seahawks after going undrafted in the 2010 NFL Draft.
He was cut from the Seahawks on September 4, 2010, but was then immediately picked up the following day to be a part of the 2010 Seahawks practice squad because of a solid preseason performance. He was then brought up from the practice squad and was 2nd string ILB below former Seahawks MLB Lofa Tatupu, but did play UpBack on special teams occasionally. The Seahawks released Pawelek on July 29, 2011.

Jacksonville Jaguars
On October 12, 2011, he was signed to the Jacksonville Jaguars' practice squad. He was released from the practice squad two weeks later on October 26.

Awards and honors
2006 FWAA, Sporting News and College Football News Freshman First-team All-American
2006 Rivals.com Freshman Second-team All-American
2006, 2007, 2008 Academic All-Big 12 first-team
2007 All-Big 12 honorable mention
2008 All-Big 12 first-team
2008 ESPN The Magazine Second-team All-American

References

External links
Baylor Bears bio
Seattle Seahawks bio
Jacksonville Jaguars bio

1986 births
Living people
Sportspeople from Corpus Christi, Texas
Players of American football from San Antonio
American football linebackers
Baylor Bears football players
Seattle Seahawks players
Jacksonville Jaguars players